Alcove Reservoir is a reservoir located in Albany County, New York, United States. It serves as water supply for the city of Albany. At  in elevation, the closest hamlet is Alcove, part of the town of Coeymans. New York State Route 32 passes the reservoir on the west. It was built 1928–1932, inundating the village of Indian Fields.

The Alcove Reservoir is fed by the Hannacroix Creek, Silver Creek and Gulf Creek.

References

Albany Water Systems
City of Albany - Annual Drinking Water Quality Report 2006 
History of Coeymans 
    2006-05-24, p. 69

External links

Reservoirs in New York (state)
Geography of Albany, New York
Protected areas of Albany County, New York
Reservoirs in Albany County, New York